Wallace Christopher Smith (born 5 March 1986) is a Scottish professional footballer who last played as a goalkeeper for Scottish League One side Dumbarton.

Smith has previously played for St Mirren, Dunfermline Athletic, Stenhousemuir, Stirling Albion, East Kilbride, Dumbarton (on loan) and Annan Athletic.

Career
Smith, a goalkeeper born in Glasgow, progressed through the youth ranks at St Mirren.  He helped the club win two trophies in 2005–06, when St Mirren won the 2005 Scottish Challenge Cup Final and the 2005–06 Scottish First Division championship.

He then signed a contract to keep him at St Mirren until the summer of 2011. Following the departure of Tony Bullock and Craig Hinchliffe, he became the first choice goalkeeper for the Buddies, although he suffered a cruciate ligament injury in March 2009. He was a regular in the Scotland under-21 squad. For the 2009–10 season, Smith's number 1 shirt was given to new signing Paul Gallacher and he was given 30 instead.

On 1 December 2009, Smith was loaned for a month to Dunfermline Athletic in the Scottish Football League First Division. Smith played three times for the Pars before breaking his foot and returning to St Mirren. He re-joined Dunfermline for a second loan spell later in the season. He then joined Dunfermline outright, on a one-year deal for the 2010–11 season. Smith played regularly for Dunfermline in the latter part of the 2011–12 Scottish Premier League season, due to injuries suffered by Paul Gallacher and Iain Turner. He was released by Dunfermline at the end of the season.

Smith signed for St Mirren in August 2012, providing cover after Grant Adam suffered a tibia injury.

On 22 March 2013, Smith was loaned out to Second Division Stenhousemuir until the end of season 2012–13.
At the end of the 2014–15 season, Smith agreed terms with Stirling Albion. Smith spent two seasons with the Binos before being released in May 2017. Smith subsequently re-signed for Stenhousemuir in June 2017. He joined East Kilbride in the summer of 2018, before joining Scottish League One side Dumbarton on loan in October 2018 after Grant Adam was ruled out through injury. After five appearances he left the club in November 2018, before returning three weeks later again on an emergency loan deal. He joined Scottish League Two side Annan Athletic in November 2019 after impressing as a trialist. He joined Dumbarton for a second time, this time on a permanent deal, in October 2020. He left the club due to work commitments on 6 April 2021.

Personal life 
Outside of football, Smith works as a police officer in Glasgow.

Career statistics

References

External links
 

1986 births
Police Scotland officers
Footballers from Glasgow
Living people
Association football goalkeepers
Scottish footballers
St Mirren F.C. players
Scottish Football League players
Scottish Premier League players
Dunfermline Athletic F.C. players
Scotland under-21 international footballers
Scottish Professional Football League players
Stenhousemuir F.C. players
Dumbarton F.C. players
Stirling Albion F.C. players
East Kilbride F.C. players
Annan Athletic F.C. players
Scottish police officers